In mathematics, the Benjamin–Ono equation is a nonlinear partial integro-differential equation that 
describes one-dimensional internal waves in deep water.

The Benjamin–Ono equation is

where H is the Hilbert transform.

See also
 Bretherton equation

References

External links
Benjamin-Ono equations: Solitons and Shock Waves

Nonlinear partial differential equations
Integrable systems